Wang Jun (born on June 24, 1976) is a former soccer player who played for Tianjin Vanke from 1995 to 1997 and transferred to Tianjin Teda in 1998. He was one of three captains in Tianjin Teda since 2006. He retired from soccer on December 10, 2007, aged 31. After his retirement, he became an assistant coach for Tianjin Teda.

Biography
Wang Jun began his professional football career with third-tier club Tianjin Vanke in the 1996 league season  and saw them win promotion to the second tier. After only one season the club were relegated and the club decided to disband, allowing for Wang Jun to leave. He would stay within Tianjin to join recently relegated second-tier side Tianjin Teda and within his first season see the club win promotion to the top tier. The following season would see Wang Jun aid Tianjin Teda to mid-table safety and then build a relationship with the club that lasted for ten years that would eventually see Wang named as the team's captain until he retired at the end of the 2007 league season.

Honours
Tianjin Teda
Chinese Jia B League: 1998

References

External links
Profile at Sohu Sports

1976 births
Living people
Chinese footballers
Footballers from Tianjin
Tianjin Jinmen Tiger F.C. players
Association football midfielders